is a Japanese former professional footballer who played as a defender.

Playing career
Ishikawa was born and raised in Kashiwa. He is a product of the Kashiwa Reysol youth academy, having come up through the ranks into the reserve squad in 2003.

He turned full-time professional with Reysol at the start of the 2004 season and made his first team debut against Kawasaki Frontale on 23 October 2005. He served as players chairperson in 2008. In early 2009, Ishikawa signed a loan deal with Consadole Sapporo. At Consadole, Ishikawa reunited with former Reysol manager Nobuhiro Ishizaki. He quickly became their key player and served as team's captain in 2010.

In 2011, Ishikawa completed a permanent move to Albirex Niigata.

Club statistics

References

External links

 Profile at Hokkaido Consadole Sapporo
  

1985 births
Living people
People from Kashiwa
Association football people from Chiba Prefecture
Japanese footballers
J1 League players
J2 League players
Kashiwa Reysol players
Hokkaido Consadole Sapporo players
Albirex Niigata players
Vegalta Sendai players
Association football defenders